Husøy may refer to:

Places
Husøy, Senja, an island/village off the coast of Senja in Lenvik municipality, Norway
Husøy, Solund, an island in Solund municipality, Norway
Husøy, Træna, the administrative centre of Træna municipality, Norway (also called Husøya)
Husøy, Tønsberg, an island in Tønsberg municipality, Norway

Churches
Husøy Chapel, a chapel in Lenvik municipality, Troms county, Norway
Husøy Church (Solund) (historically known as Husøy Chapel), a church in Solund municipality, Sogn og Fjordane county, Norway
Husøy Church (Tønsberg), a church in Tønsberg municipality, Vestfold county, Norway

People
Inger Lise Husøy, a Norwegian trade unionist and politician
John Andreas Husøy, a Norwegian footballer who plays for Åsane
Kari Husøy, a Norwegian politician